Hank Pitcher (born 1949) is an American contemporary artist. Pitcher is known for his paintings of coastal landscapes and California culture. 

Pitcher he has been a senior lecturer in the College of Creative Studies at University of California, Santa Barbara since 1971.

His work is included in the collections of the Santa Barbara Museum of Art, the Syracuse Museum of Art at Syracuse University, New York and the Museum of Fine Arts Houston.

References 

Living people
1949 births
Artists from Pasadena, California
University of California, Santa Barbara alumni
20th-century American painters
21st-century American painters